Mosolwa Mashudu Mafuma (born 13 February 1996) is a South African rugby union player. His usual playing position is on the wing.

Rugby career

2012: Schoolboy rugby

Mafuma was born in Germiston and attended St Benedict's College.

2016: Varsity Cup / South Africa Under-20 / Free State XV

Mafuma didn't earn further provincial representations during his high school career and it wasn't until 2016 that he sprung to prominence in a national competition; he was included in the  squad that participated in the 2016 Varsity Cup competition. He was an unused reserve in their final match against . At the conclusion of the tournament, Mafuma was named the "Player That Rocks" for the competition.

He was invited to join a South Africa Under-20 training squad, also making the cut for a reduced provisional squad named a week later. He made his first class debut in their Round Three match against , immediately proving his worth at this level by scoring two tries for his side. It was not enough, however, as the team from Cape Town won the match 36–31. He also played off the bench in their match against a  a fortnight later. On 10 May 2016, he was included in the final South Africa Under-20 squad for the 2016 World Rugby Under 20 Championship tournament held in Manchester, England. He started their opening match in Pool C of the tournament as South Africa came from behind to beat Japan 59–19, scoring South Africa's seventh try of the match. He also started their next pool match as South Africa were beaten 13–19 by Argentina. He wasn't in the squad for their final pool match, as South Africa bounced back to secure a 40-31 bonus-point victory over France to secure a semi-final place as the best runner-up in the competition. He was restored to the starting line-up for the semi-final, as South Africa faced three-time champions England. The hosts proving too strong for South Africa, knocking them out of the competition with a 39–17 victory. Mafuma didn't feature against Argentina in the third-place play-off match, as Argentina beat South Africa – as they did in the pool stages – convincingly winning 49–19 and in the process condemning South Africa to fourth place in the competition.

Athletics

Mafuma also participated in athletics at high school level, taking part in the 100m and 200m sprint events. He ran the 100m in 10.80 second and the 200m in 21.90 seconds at the Under-18 South African Championships in Pretoria in 2013, the fourth-fastest 100m time and seventh-fastest 200m time of the season for his age group. He broke 100m records at Under-15 and Under-16 level and also took part in other events such as 100m hurdles and the high jump.

Notes

References

South African rugby union players
Living people
1996 births
Rugby union players from Germiston
Rugby union wings
Free State Cheetahs players
South Africa Under-20 international rugby union players
Cheetahs (rugby union) players